A Green bond (also known as climate bond) is a fixed-income financial instruments (bond) which is used to fund projects that have positive environmental and/or climate benefits. They follow the Green Bond Principles stated by the International Capital Market Association (ICMA), and the proceeds from the issuance of which are to be used for the pre-specified types of projects.

Like normal bonds, climate bonds can be issued by governments, multi-national banks or corporations and the issuing organization repays the bond and any interest.  The main difference is that the funds will be used only for positive climate change or environmental projects. This allows investors to target their environmental, social, and corporate governance (ESG) goals by investing in them. They are similar to Sustainability Bonds but sustainability bonds also needs to have a positive social outcome.

History 
Climate bonds were first proposed in the 2000s, and have grown rapidly since then. , the total volume of climate bonds was estimated at 160 billions of dollars; of which 70 billions were issued in 2016. The labelled volume of bonds issued in 2019 was US$255 billion. Climate and green bonds have now been issued by thousands of issuers around the world, including sovereigns, banks and companies of all sizes, and local governments.

Voters in the City of San Francisco approved a revenue bond authority in 2001, in the form of a city charter amendment (Section 9.107.8) known as the "solar bonds," to finance renewable energy and energy conservation measures on homes, businesses and government buildings. The campaign for solar bonds, Proposition H, was motivated by the need for the city to take meaningful action on climate change.  The solar bond authority was being used as part of the city's renewable energy program, administered by the San Francisco Public Utilities Commission, CleanPowerSF.

The European Investment Bank (EIB) issued an equity index-linked bond in 2007, which became the first fixed income product among socially responsible investments. This "Climate Awareness Bond" structure was used to fund renewable energy and energy efficiency projects. Afterwards, The World Bank became first in the world to issue a labelled "green bond" in 2008, which followed a conventional "plain vanilla" bond structure, contrary to EIB's equity-linked Climate Awareness Bond.

The green bond market has subsequently increased rapidly in issuance. From 2015 to 2016, the Climate Bonds Initiative reports that there was a 92% increase in green bonds issuance to $92 billion, with different types of issuers starting to issue green bonds. Apple, for example, became the first tech company to issue a green bond in 2016, and Poland became the first sovereign country to issue a green bond at the end of 2016. In 2021, the EIB was the leading issuer of green and sustainability bonds among multilateral development banks, with sustainability funding reaching €11.5 billion equivalent.

In 2020, the UK's first ever local government green bond, for West Berkshire Council, closed after reaching its £1mn target five days early. Announced on Wednesday 14 October 2020, 22% of the funds raised came from West Berkshire residents, who invested an average of £3,500. The Community Municipal Investment attracted 640 investors in total. In September 2021, the UK's inaugural "green gilt" sale drew over £100bn from investors, making it the highest ever for a UK government bond sale.

In Canada, The Community Bond, an innovation in social finance that allows benevolent organizations to issues bonds outside of traditional regulatory oversight, is being used as a "Green Bond" by environmental groups like Solarshare  to build community owned solar farms, ZooShare  to finance a biogas plant, and Hallbar.org as means to finance energy saving home upgrades and LEED certified building construction.

Description 
Climate bonds are issued in order to raise finance for climate change solutions: climate change mitigation or adaptation related projects or programs. These might be greenhouse gas emission reduction projects ranging from clean energy to energy efficiency, or climate change adaptation projects ranging from building Nile delta flood defences or helping the Great Barrier Reef adapt to warming waters.

Like normal bonds, climate bonds can be issued by governments, multi-national banks or corporations. The issuing entity guarantees to repay the bond over a certain period of time, plus either a fixed or variable rate of return.

Most climate bonds are asset-backed, or ringfenced, with investors being promised that all funds raised will only go to specified climate-related programs or assets, such as renewable energy plants or climate mitigation focused funding programs.

In their UNEP paper on investors and climate change, Mackenzie and Ascui differentiate a climate bond from a green bond:
"(A climate bond is) an extension of the green bond concept. Green bonds are issued [...] in order to raise the finance for an environmental project. Climate bonds [are] issued [...] to raise finance for investments in emission reduction or climate change adaptation."

The London-based Climate Bonds Initiative provides the world's first Certification program for climate bonds. This has been used as a model for various countries to set up their own green bond listing guidelines.

Climate bonds are theme bonds, similar in principle to a railway bond of the 19th century, the war bonds of the early 20th century or the highway bond of the 1960s. Theme bonds are designed to:
 Allow institutional capital - pension, government, insurance and sovereign wealth funds - to invest in areas seen as politically important to their stakeholders that have the same credit risk and returns profile as standards bonds.
 Provide a means for governments to direct funding to climate change mitigation. For example, this might be done by choosing to privilege qualifying bonds with preferential tax treatments.
 Send a political signal to other stakeholders.

Otherwise, for operational purposes, theme bonds largely function as conventional debt instruments. They are risk-weighted and credit rated in the usual way based on the creditworthiness of the issuer, and tradable, market conditions permitting, in international secondary bond markets. These instruments can theoretically be issued at all levels of the fixed income market, from sovereigns to corporate.

Benefits of green bonds
The growth of bond markets provides increasing opportunities to finance the implementation of the Sustainable Development Goals, Nationally Determined Contributions and other green growth projects. A UN conference held on the Sustainable Development Goals in 2021 emphasized the importance of sustainable bonds, and stated that of the approximately €300 trillion of financial assets on the markets, only 1% would be needed to achieve the SDGs. Green bonds are becoming an increasingly prevalent form of green finance, particularly for clean and sustainable infrastructure development and their large funding needs. They offer a vehicle to both access finance from the capital markets and deliver green impacts that can be verified against standards. In developing countries, green bonds are already financing critical projects, including renewable energy, 
urban mass transit systems and water distribution.

Green bonds mobilised over $93 billion in 2016 to projects and assets with positive environmental impacts.

Of total global bond issuance, however, this is still around just 1%.

According to a report by the Climate and Development Knowledge Network (CDKN) and PricewaterhouseCoopers, a green bond market has three key benefits to a country and its environmental goals and commitments.

It increases the finance available for green projects, therefore incentivising an increase in their number. Today, green bonds mainly finance projects within renewable energy, energy efficiency, low-carbon transport, sustainable water, and waste and pollution.
It is a viable vehicle for enabling the increasing pool of sustainable investors to access environmental projects. Bonds are an instrument and an approach with which foreign investors are familiar, so these institutions need little new understanding or capacity. Investors are also interested in placing money where the environmental impact achieved is highest per unit of currency, and emerging and developing economies have the potential to offer this where lower project costs exist. 
It can be a catalyst for further development of the domestic capital market and financial system more broadly beyond environmentally related projects.

Demand for green bonds
The Business and Sustainable Development Commission describes at least US$12 trillion in market opportunities for business from sustainable business models.

The United Nations estimates an annual funding gap of $2.5 trillion is needed for the achievement of the Sustainable Development Goals (SDGs), and within this, US$1 trillion is needed annually for clean energy alone. A large number and broad range of projects and assets that contribute to achieving the 17 SDGs need this funding for their development and operation.

One of the SDGs where 'green finance' has been successfully mobilised is on clean energy and climate action. The Paris Agreement on climate change entered into force in November 2016, after 196 countries committed to reducing greenhouse gas emissions. Significant quantities of finance are now needed to convert country commitments (Nationally Determined Contributions, NDCs) to implementation and a low-carbon, climate-resilient economy.

Despite recent increases in volumes of climate finance, a significant funding gap will arise unless new sources and channels of finance are mobilised.

Existing international public finance dedicated to climate change is unable to achieve the rapid change required in meeting the finance gap alone. Furthermore, public sector balance sheets do not have the capacity to fund the amounts needed, and so an estimated 80–90% of funding will need to come from the private sector.

Bank balance sheets can take only a proportion of the private finance needed so the capital markets have to be leveraged, along with other sources such as insurance and peer-to-peer.

According to GUIDE: New markets for green bonds, the demand for green bonds has grown quickly on the investor side, with asset owners and managers diversifying their investment portfolios and seeking positive impact beyond financial return. In the light of the global commitment to shift to a green and low-carbon economy, the green bond market has the potential to grow substantially, while attracting more diverse issuers and investors. The number of green bonds continue growing daily.

Emerging and frontier markets are building the markets, financing facilities, and investment-grade debt and equity products for climate bonds and green investments more aggressively than most Western, developed economies.

Criticism and controversies 
The green bond market has attracted international criticism with some questioning the green credentials of certain bonds. This criticism pertains both to the projects that are funded, as well as the sustainability credentials of the issuers. In May 2017, the Climate Bonds Initiative refused to list a "green" bond issued by Repsol. The bonds proceeds would be allocated to initiatives meant to improve the efficiency of the company's oil and gas production operations. The NGO argued that - even though the projects would reduce  emissions - the company's sustainability strategy did not go far enough from an environmental perspective to classify it as green. This criticism was extended to Vigeo Eiris, the company that reviewed the Repsol bond's green credentials. In 2016, Vigeo Eiris was involved in another green bond controversy. They were targeted by Western Sahara Resource Watch, an NGO backed by a Norwegian trade union, after it reviewed a green bond that would fund the production of solar projects by a Moroccan government agency in the illegally occupied territory of Western Sahara.

More generally, the academic community and market participants have identified the susceptibility of voluntary green-labelling to greenwashing and adverse selection as a function of the perceived lack of regulatory oversight and the inherent, albeit anecdotal, capital arbitrage opportunity presented to some issuers through the green pricing premium, or "greenium".

See also
 Divestment (for social goals)
 Green economy
 Green lending
 Green money (disambiguation)
 Greenwashing
 Social impact bond

References

External links
 Climate Bonds Initiative
 Government magazine on climate bonds
 Mongabay

Government bonds
Climate change policy
Derivatives (finance)
Futures markets